Mark Mullins is a former Irish GAA sportsperson. A native of Muine Bheag, County Carlow he played hurling at various times with his local clubs Erin's Own Carlow and Na Piarsaigh Cork as well as with the Carlow(1986 - 1992) and Cork senior inter-county teams (1993 - 19996). Mullins had the honour to play at center forward on the Leinster 1992 Railway Cup team and to captain Cork in the 1996 Munster Championship.

References

 

Year of birth missing (living people)
Living people
Erin's Own (Carlow) hurlers
Na Piarsaigh hurlers
Carlow inter-county hurlers
Cork inter-county hurlers